Eric Racy (born 10 September 1980) is a platinum selling Mixing Engineer and Producer.

Currently, he lives and works in LA in a wide range of genres and with clients ranging from indie bands to Grammy Winning pop artists.   His clients have included Katy Perry, Nicki Minaj, Pharrell, Tyga, Jonathan Davis, 2NE1, Troye Sivan, Alessia Cara, Kelly Clarkson, Divinity Roxx, Kelly Rowland, J. Cole, Janelle Monáe, T-Pain, Missy Elliott, Zendaya, Lil Wayne, Big Sean, Busta Rhymes, Photek and many more.  Eric is managed by Chris Woods for Alignment Management.

Career

Production & Mixing 
Eric started his career in the underground dance music scene in 1998, producing Drum and Bass and eventually working alongside EDM legends like Loxy & Ink, Soul Slinger and Tech Itch.  After releasing singles on Renegade Hardware and Liquid Sky he began to move away from drum and bass towards traditional engineering and turned his attention to working with artists and bands.

In 2008, Racy relocated to Los Angeles where he began focusing more heavily on mixing.  In 2011, while working with the band Vayden, lead singer Curtis Casey introduced Racy to record producer Jess Jackson who was working on Tyga's major label debut album Careless World.  Shortly after the meeting, Jackson brought Racy on to mix the project which went on to produce multiple Gold and Platinum singles.  After Careless World, Racy's demand continued to increase both in the urban and pop genres leading him to work with and mix songs for artists including Troye Sivan, Alessia Cara, Divinity Roxx, Jonathan Davis, Photek, Major Myjah and many more.

In 2016, Eric was hired to mix the single "This is For My Girls", a charity single commissioned by First Lady Michelle Obama, featuring Kelly Clarkson, Kelly Rowland, Janelle Monáe, Missy Elliott, Zendaya, Jadagrace, Chloe & Halle and written by Diane Warren.  Proceeds from the single benefits Michelle Obama's 'Let Girls Learn' initiative as well as the First Lady's #62MillionGirls campaign, targeted towards helping young ladies around the world complete their education.

2ne1 'New Evolution' Global Tour & Katy Perry's 'Prismatic World Tour' 
Shortly after the release of Careless World, Racy was asked to join YG Entertainment for the mega K Pop group 2NE1's first world tour.  Alongside former members of Michael Jackson, Cee-Lo and Beyonce's camps, Eric traveled to Seoul to help program and create the audio and multimedia for the show. Racy traveled with the group as part of the band for the duration of the tour and also created a remix of 2ne1's hit "I am the best" that was used for the concert's finale.  The remix appears on the 'Live in Japan' tour DVD.

In 2014, while back in the studio in LA, Racy was approached to join the Katy Perry "Prismatic" World Tour to help build and program the show as he had for 2ne1's 'New Evolution'.  After spending several months creating the show in Los Angeles, Eric traveled with Katy and the tour for the first leg before heading back to the studio.  The Prismatic World Tour which opened to critical acclaim continued throughout 2014/2015, becoming Perry's most successful tour to date.

In addition to his work as a mixer, Racy is also one half of "Black Box Analog Design", a boutique company that builds handmade tube, studio equipment.

Selected Credits

References

1980 births
Living people
American audio engineers